State Route 318 (SR 318) is a state highway in eastern Nevada. It is often used as a shortcut for long-distance traffic along U.S. Route 93, bypassing the longer and less direct route U.S. Route 93 follows between Ely and Crystal Springs. The highway was established in the 1930s as State Route 38 and State Route 38A, and was renumbered to SR 318 in 1976. The road is used for open speed highway races twice a year.

Route description

SR 318 begins on U.S. Route 93 (US 93) at Crystal Springs in Lincoln County. From there, it travels north through Hiko. SR 318 generally parallels the route of the White River on its trek northward. The highway travels through Nye County and the town of Sunnyside. The highway then enters White Pine County and serves the community of Lund.

The racing video game Need for Speed: ProStreet features a portion of the highway as a racing track for Speed Challenges.

History

A county road approximating the course of the present highway was indicated on state maps by 1933. As of 1935, State Route 38 was designated along the north end of the county road, between State Route 4 (later US 6) at Barnes and the town of Lund. This  segment of highway was completely paved by 1936. By 1939, however, SR 60 was removed and replaced by SR 38A—the southern end of the route was also shifted more easterly by this time. In 1942, the entire  length of SR 38A between US 93 and Lund had been graded to more closely follow the White River.

SR 38 would remain relatively unchanged, except for gradual pavement upgrades, for several years. However, on July 1, 1976, Nevada began a major renumbering of all its state highway system. In that process, SR 38 was rechristened as the new State Route 318. The changes were first noted on the 1978 edition of the official state highway map. The route number conversion was completed by 1982—by that time, the entire highway was completely paved.

At the request of White Pine County's Board of Tourism and Recreation, the Nevada Board of Transportation renamed SR 318 from "Sunnyside Road" to the "Silver State Classic Challenge Highway" on May 24, 2012. More than 100 miles of the highway, between Lund, Nevada and Hiko, Nevada are closed twice a year for the Nevada Open Road Challenge and Silver State Classic Challenge road races.

On June 24, 2020, part of the highway was closed near Lund, Nevada as the Brown Fire grew, burning almost parallel to the highway.

Major intersections
Note: Mileposts in Nevada reset at county lines; the start and end mileposts for each county are given in the county column.

See also

References

External links

AARoads: Misc Nevada photos (contains pictures of SR 318)
Silver State Classic Challenge official website

318
Transportation in White Pine County, Nevada
Transportation in Lincoln County, Nevada
Transportation in Nye County, Nevada